Reading Room West (Danish: Læsesal Vest) or The Research Reading Room at The Royal Danish Library is a part of The Danish National Library and is located in Black Diamond, the Royal Library's modern extension on Slotsholmen in Copenhagen. The history of the reading room has its roots in the foundation of The Royal Library by King Frederik III and it has been relocated several times since then.

The purpose of the reading room is:

 To make it possible for users to study materials from the library’s collection, which are restricted to the premises
 To make a large reference collection available for the users
 To house reserved desks for researchers

Target group:

 The University of Copenhagen
 Researchers from Denmark and abroad
 Others who seek knowledge at a higher level

The reference collection in Reading Room West consists of 2 levels with a combined capacity of 65.000 volumes. It covers several of the subject areas of The Royal Library, but there is an emphasis on the humanities and theology.

External links 
 Reading Room West
 Department of Manuscripts & Rare Books

Libraries in Denmark

da:Den Sorte Diamant#Læsesal Vest